Léraba is one of the 45 provinces of Burkina Faso, located in its Cascades Region.

Its capital is Sindou.

Departments
Leraba is divided into 8 departments:

See also
Regions of Burkina Faso
Provinces of Burkina Faso
Departments of Burkina Faso

References

 
Provinces of Burkina Faso